"Reason to Believe" is a song by Tim Hardin.

Reason to Believe may also refer to:

 Reason to Believe (Pennywise album), 2008
 Reason to Believe (Rita MacNeil album), 1988
 Reason to Believe (Lionel Richie song)
 "Reason to Believe", a song by Bruce Springsteen from Nebraska
 "Reason to Believe", a song by Dashboard Confessional from Dusk and Summer
 "Reason to Believe", a song by Sum 41 from Screaming Bloody Murder
 Reason to Believe: The Complete Mercury Studio Recordings, a 2002 compilation by Rod Stewart
 “Reason to Believe”, a song by Arch Enemy from Will to Power